Henry Muhlenberg was an American politician. He served as the 21st mayor of Lancaster, Pennsylvania from 1900 to 1902.

References

Mayors of Lancaster, Pennsylvania
Year of birth missing
Year of death missing